The Yeongeunmun or Yeongeunmun Gate is a historical structure once located in the Joseon Dynasty. Since it was a symbol of China's diplomatic influence on the Joseon, the Gaehwa Party of the Joseon government intentionally demolished it in February 1895, seeking for complete political independence of Joseon from China.

History 

For a long time, the Joseon Dynasty continued its diplomatic policy with the Late Chinese Empires in an arrangement respecting the political influence of China. This was typically called as Sadae, which translates literally"serving" the "greater" country (usually translated into suzerainity, flunkeyism or the term "serving the Great"). This mode of diplomatic relationship was later forced by the Qing dynasty, through the Qing invasion of Joseon in 1636.

Located at the current northwestern part of Seoul, South Korea, the Yeongeunmun was one of Joseon's materialized symbols of Sadae. In 1407, King Taejong of Joseon built a special state guest house for Chinese envoys to rest en route from China to Joseon, outside of Seoul's West gate. It was named "Mohwa Pavilion", literally in meaning of "Pavilion" "admiring" "Chinese civilization". Its name was later changed to "Mohwa Guesthouse" in 1430 by King Sejong the Great of Joseon, simply changing meaning of "Pavilion" to "Guesthouse".

King Sejong also built a Hongsalmun near the Mohwa Guesthouse. This guesthouse had an arrow-shaped decoration on its top. It was then reconstructed into a new gate in 1537, and became notorious after it was officially named as "Yeongjomun" by Jungjong of Joseon, literally in meaning of "Gate" "welcoming" "messages from China". Yet, Chinese diplomats insisted they were not just delivering messages, so the name of gate was changed to Yeongeunmun in 1539, meaning "Gate welcoming grace from China". Though its official name was confirmed as Yeongeunmun from that time, it was also called as Yeonjumun or Yeoneunmun. The structure had a hip roof and columns over two long plinths.

Demolition 

In late 19th century, The Gaehwa Party of Joseon tried to modernize the country. One of its political goals was turning Joseon into a completely independent state. So in February 1895, during a period called the Gabo Reform, the Gaehwa Party demolished Yeongeunmun to show Joseon's enthusiasm of independence around the world. They thought the Mohwa Guesthouse could be reformed into another use, yet Yeongeunmun had to be demolished. Meanwhile, Soh Jaipil, a Korean-American political activist supporting independence of Joseon, planned the building of a new gate near the ruins of a demolished Yeongeunmun to symbolize the independent status of Joseon and his plan eventually obtained support from King Gojong. After Joseon was reestablished into the Korean Empire in 1897, there was a new gate built by Soh Jaipil, named as 'Independence Gate', at the site overlooking the ruins of the demolished Yeongeunmun. Also, the Mohwa Guesthouse was reformed into an "Independence Hall". For this long historical background, in 1963, South Korean government has designated the ruins of the demolished Yeongeunmun as a Historic Site of South Korea, and relocated them to another place for preservation in 1979.

Gallery

See also 

 Qing invasion of Joseon
 Gaehwa Party
 Joseon Dynasty
 Korean Empire
 Plinths of Yeongeunmun Gate, Seoul
 Independence Gate
 Historic Sites of South Korea

References 

Joseon dynasty
Gates in Korea
Demolished buildings and structures in South Korea
Buildings and structures demolished in 1895